Alexander Meston (1 June 1898 – 1 March 1980) was an English cricketer. He played for Essex between 1926 and 1927.

References

External links

1898 births
1980 deaths
English cricketers
Essex cricketers
People from Leyton